Linton Lewis (born 24 December 1959) is a Vincentian cricketer. He played in 32 first-class and 18 List A matches for the Windward Islands from 1977 to 1991.

See also
 List of Windward Islands first-class cricketers

References

External links
 

1959 births
Living people
Saint Vincent and the Grenadines cricketers
Windward Islands cricketers